is a pair of kofun burial mounds located in the Izumi neighborhood of the city of Toki, Gifu in the Chūbu region of Japan. The two tumuli were collectively designated a National Historic Site of Japan in 1938.

Overview
It is the largest kofun in the city. Huge monolithic stones were also used for the ceiling. From the construction method, it is believed that the tumulus dates from the middle of the seventh century. According to local tradition, this is the tomb of Oto-hime, the younger sister of Yasakarihime, consort to the legendary Emperor Keikō (71–130 AD).

The tomb has been open since ancient times, and was used as a Buddhist chapel in the Edo Period and as an air raid shelter in World War II. For many years, it was controlled by a local Shinto shrine, but was purchased by they city of Toki. In 1988, the trees which had grown on the tumulus were cut down, revealing its true configuration, and an archaeological excavation was conducted by the Toki City Board of Education from  2003 to 2006. Fragments of Sue ware pottery were also discovered.

The Danjirimaki kofun is a circular-shaped tumulus located  70 meters to the northwest of the Otozuka Kofun. It has a diameter of 12.8 meters and height of 3.6 meters. The burial chamber is also a lateral passage opening to the south, with a total length of 8.7 meters. A monolith with a width of 1.7 meters was used for the back wall, and the side walls were lined with granite and chert in three layers. This tumulus is also thought to date from the first half to the middle of the 7th century.

The site is about a 15-minute walk from Tokishi Station on the JR East Chūō Main Line.

See also
List of Historic Sites of Japan (Gifu)

References

External links
 Gifu Prefecture home page 
Toki city official site 

Kofun
History of Gifu Prefecture
Toki, Gifu
Historic Sites of Japan
Archaeological sites in Japan